Challenge The Yankees was a popular baseball board game, sold only in 1964 and 1965 by Hasbro (Hassenfeld Bros.) of Pawtucket, Rhode Island. The game and many of its components, especially the player cards is now a popular eBay item, consisting of 25 New York Yankees player cards, 25 All Star player cards (non-Yankees), a baseball diamond game board, cards representing different plays (single, double, triple, fly ball, ground ball) 4 pegs to move around the bases, manager strategy cards, and other accessories. The player up at bat rolls the dice, and refers to that "batter's" card, to check to see what that dice roll represents for that particular ball player, and moves a pegs accordingly. Each player's card is different, for example, a dice roll of 3 when Yogi Berra is at bat represents a home run, while a 3 rolled for Bill Mazeroski represents a base on balls. The object is to score the most runs at the end of 9 innings.

The 50 player cards in the set are approximately 4" × 5½", with a blank back, and feature a small black & white photo of the player, a facsimile autograph, and a few biographical details and stats. The only way to distinguish the cards between the two years is to compare the stats. There has been some confusion over the years about the 50 player cards in the 1964 set, and the 50 in the 1965 set. Some players are the same in both editions, and some are different.

Collectors
Collectors like to be certain which year player card they are buying. Below is the complete listing of 1964 and 1965 cards. The ERA for pitchers and batting averages for the position players are noted in order to distinguish between 1964 and 1965. Only four of the 100 cards are identical for the two years: Yankees Hector Lopez and Tom Metcalf, and All Stars Carl Yastrzemski and Johnny Podres. Every other card differs in some small way, either by player fact, ERA or Batting Average.

1964 Set
Position Player's Batting Ave or Pitcher's ERA

1965 Set

Notes for 1965 cards where Pitcher's ERA or Player's Batting Average are the same as in the 1964 set
Mickey Mantle - All Star Years Listed; Hank Aaron - 64 All Star noted; Dick Grote - 64 All Star noted; Bill Mazeroski - 64 All Star noted; Johnny Podres - Same Card 64/65; Carl Yastrzemski - Same Card 64/65; Héctor López - Same Card 64/65; Tom Metcalf - Same Card 64/65.

Also note that some of the 1965 cards have single digit numbers or letters in the top right or left hand corner of the card.

1965 Yankee Rollie Sheldon Card
Not all of the 1965 sets contain the NYY Rollie Sheldon card. Rollie was traded to Kansas City on May 3, 1965 and his card was withdrawn from the set, making it more scarce than the others.

References

Board games introduced in 1964
Sports board games
Hasbro games
Baseball board games